The Lorax is a children's book written by Dr. Seuss and published in 1971. It chronicles the plight of the environment and the Lorax, the titular character, who "speaks for the trees" and confronts the Once-ler, a business magnate who causes environmental destruction. Just like most Dr. Seuss works, most of the creatures mentioned are original to the book.

The story is commonly recognized as a fable concerning the danger of greed causing human destruction of the natural environment, using the literary element of personification to create relatable characters for industry (as the Once-ler), the environment (being the Truffula trees) and environmental activism (as the Lorax). The story encourages personal care and involvement in making the situation better: a quote from the Lorax states, "Unless someone like you cares a whole awful lot, nothing is going to get better. It's not".

It was Dr. Seuss's personal favorite of his books. He was able to create an engaging story addressing industrial/economic and environmental issues. Dr. Seuss stated: "The Lorax came out of me being angry. The ecology books I'd read were dull...In The Lorax I was out to attack what I think are evil things and let the chips fall where they might".

Plot
A boy living in a polluted area wanders down the Street of the Lifted Lorax and visits a strange, reclusive man known as the Once-ler. The boy pays the Once-ler fifteen cents, a nail, and the shell of a great-great-great-grandfather snail to hear the story of how the Lorax was lifted away. 

The Once-ler tells the boy that many years ago, he arrived in a beautiful valley containing a forest of Truffula Trees and a range of animals. Having long searched for such a tree as the Truffula, he cut one down and used its foliage to knit an incredibly versatile garment known as the Thneed. A strange creature known as the Lorax emerged from the tree's stump and voiced his disapproval of the Once-ler's actions. After a man bought the Thneed for $3.98, the Once-ler, ignoring the Lorax's protests, phoned his relatives and asked them to come and help him with his new business. 

The Once-ler's small shop soon grew into a large factory, and new vehicles were built to log the Truffula forest and ship out Thneeds. As time went on, the valley became choked with pollution, and the Lorax sent the animals away to find more hospitable habitats. The Once-ler was unrepentant and vowed to continue "biggering" his operations, but at that moment, one of his machines felled the last Truffula Tree. Without raw materials, the factory closed down and the Once-ler's relatives left him. The Lorax sadly lifted himself into the air and disappeared through the smog, leaving behind a stone platform engraved with the word "UNLESS". The distraught Once-ler punished himself with years of self-imposed exile, pondering the Lorax's message. 

After finishing his story, the Once-ler realizes what the Lorax meant: unless somebody cares, the situation will not improve. He then gives the boy the last Truffula seed and urges him to grow a forest from it, hoping that the Lorax and the animals will return.

Inspiration
It is believed that a Monterey cypress in La Jolla, California was the inspiration for The Lorax. In June 2019, the tree was reported to have fallen.

Reception
 
Based on a 2007 online poll, the National Education Association listed The Lorax as one of its "Teachers' Top 100 Books for Children". In 2012 it was ranked number 33 among the "Top 100 Picture Books" in a survey published by School Library Journal – the second of five Dr. Seuss books on the list.

In a retrospective critique written in the journal Nature in 2011 upon the 40th anniversary of the book's publication, Emma Marris described the Lorax character as a "parody of a misanthropic ecologist". She called the book "gloomy" and expressed skepticism that its message would resonate with small children in the manner intended. Nevertheless, she praised the book as effective in conveying the consequences of ecological destruction in a way that young children will understand.

In 2012, Travis Scholl evaluated the book in a positive manner and noted the similarities between the Lorax and Biblical prophets. He attributed the similarities to Geisel's Lutheranism.

Controversy
In 1988, a school district in California kept the book on a reading list for second-graders, though some in the town claimed the book was unfair to the logging industry.

Terri Birkett, a member of a family-owned hardwood flooring factory, authored Truax. She had been offered a logging-friendly perspective to an anthropomorphic tree known as the Guardbark for the book. This 20 page booklet was published by the National Oak Flooring Manufacturers' Association (NOFMA). Just like The Lorax, the book consists of a disagreement between two people. The logging industry representative states that they have efficiency and re-seeding efforts. The Guardbark, a personification of the environmentalist movement much as the Once-ler is for big business, refuses to listen and lashes out, but in the end, he is convinced by the logger's arguments. However, this story was criticized for what were viewed as skewed arguments and clear self-interest, particularly a "casual attitude toward endangered species" that answered the Guardbark's concern for them. In addition, the book's approach as a more blatant argument, rather than one worked into a storyline, was also noted.

The line "I hear things are just as bad up in Lake Erie" was removed more than fourteen years after the story was published, after two research associates from the Ohio Sea Grant Program wrote to Seuss about the clean-up of Lake Erie. The line remains in the home video releases of the television special, in the audiobook read by Rik Mayall, and in the UK edition published by HarperCollins Children's Books.

Adaptations

1972 television special

The book was adapted as an animated musical television special produced by DePatie-Freleng Enterprises, directed by Hawley Pratt and starring the voices of Eddie Albert and Bob Holt. It was first aired by CBS on February 14, 1972. A reference to pollution of Lake Erie was spoken by one of the Humming-Fish as they depart; it remains in DVD releases of the show, although later removed from the book. The special also shows the Once-ler arguing with himself, and asking the Lorax whether shutting down his factory (thus putting hundreds of people out of work) is practical. An abridged version of the special is used in the 1994 TV movie In Search of Dr. Seuss, with Kathy Najimy's reporter character hearing the Once-ler's story.

2012 feature film

Universal Pictures and Illumination Entertainment released a 3D CGI film based upon the book. The film was released on March 2, 2012; the release coincided with the 108th birthday of Seuss, who died at 87 in 1991. The cast includes Danny DeVito as the Lorax, Zac Efron as Ted (the boy in the book), and Ed Helms as the Once-ler. The film includes several new characters: Rob Riggle as villain Aloysius O'Hare, Betty White as Ted's Grammy Norma, Jenny Slate as Ted's neurotic mother Mrs. Wiggins, and Taylor Swift as Audrey, Ted's romantic interest. The film debuted in the No. 1 spot at the box office, making $70 million, though it received mixed reviews. The film eventually grossed a domestic total of $214,030,500.

Audiobooks
Two audio readings have been released on CD, one narrated by Ted Danson in the United States (Listening Library) and one narrated by Rik Mayall in the United Kingdom (HarperCollins).

Musical
A musical adaptation of The Lorax was originally included in the script for the Broadway musical Seussical, but was cut before the show opened.

From December 2, 2015, to January 16, 2016, a musical version of the book ran at the Old Vic theatre in London, with former Noah and the Whale frontman Charlie Fink, who also wrote the music for the production.

From July 2 to August 12, 2018 the musical ran at the Old Globe Theatre San Diego, California with Steven Epp as The Once-ler. The gender role was reversed. The book has a boy, the musical cast a girl for the role of the hero to be trusted with the last seed.

See also 
 Deforestation
 Revegetation
 Tragedy of the commons

References

1971 children's books
American picture books
Books about environmentalism
Books adapted into plays
Books by Dr. Seuss
Children's books adapted into films
Dr. Seuss characters
Environmental fiction books
Fictional conservationists and environmentalists
Fictional endangered and extinct species
Literary characters introduced in 1971
Random House books